Transport in the United Kingdom is facilitated with road, air, rail, and water networks. The National Rail network of 10,072 route miles (16,116 km) in Great Britain and 189 route miles (303 route km) in Northern Ireland carries over 18,000 passenger and 1,000 freight trains daily. Urban rail networks exist in Belfast, Birmingham, Cardiff, Edinburgh, Glasgow, Liverpool, London, Manchester and Newcastle. There are many regional and international airports, with Heathrow Airport in London being one of the top ten busiest in the world. The UK also has a network of ports which received over 486 million tons of goods in 2019. Transport is the largest source of greenhouse gas emissions by the United Kingdom.

Transport trends
Since 1952 (the earliest date for which comparable figures are available), the United Kingdom saw a growth of car use, which increased its modal share, while the use of buses declined, and railway use has grown more slowly. However, since the 1990s, rail has started increasing its modal share at the expense of cars, increasing from 5% to 10% of passenger-kilometres travelled. This coincided with the privatisation of British Rail, but its impact is heavily debated.
In 1952, 27% of distance travelled was by car or taxi; with 42% being by bus or coach and 18% by rail. A further 11% was by bicycle and 3% by motorcycle. The distance travelled by air was negligible.

By 2015 83% of distance travelled was by car or taxi; with 5% being by bus and 10% by rail. Air, pedal cycle and motorcycle accounted for roughly 1% each. In terms of passenger-kilometres, slightly over 662 billion were made by cars, motorcycles vans and taxis, 78 billion by rail, 39 billion by bus, 5 billion by pedal cycle and 9 billion on domestic air flights.

Passenger transport has grown in recent years. Figures from the Department for Transport show that total passenger travel inside the United Kingdom has risen from 403 billion passenger kilometres in 1970 to 793 billion in 2015.

Freight transport has undergone similar changes, increasing in volume and shifting from railways onto the road. In 1953 89 billion tonne kilometres of goods were moved, with rail accounting for 42%, road 36% and water 22%. By 2010 the volume of freight moved had more than doubled to 222 billion tonne kilometres, of which 9% was moved by rail, 19% by water, 5% by pipeline and 68% by road. Despite the growth in tonne kilometres, the environmental external costs of trucks and lorries in the UK have reportedly decreased. Between 1990 and 2000, there has been a move to heavier goods vehicles due to major changes in the haulage industry including a shift in sales to larger articulated vehicles. A larger than average fleet turnover has ensured a swift introduction of new and cleaner vehicles in the UK.

Although the decline in railway use led to a reduction in the length of the rail network, the length of the road network has not increased in proportion to the increase in road use. In 2008, the Department for Transport stated that traffic congestion is one of the most serious transport problems facing the United Kingdom. According to the government-sponsored Eddington report of 2006, bottleneck roads are in serious danger of becoming so congested that it may damage the economy.

Greenhouse gas emissions
A critical issue for the transport sector is its contribution to climate change emissions. Transport became the largest sector of greenhouse gas emissions in 2016. Since 1990 carbon dioxide emissions from transport in the UK have reduced by just 4% compared with an economy-wide reduction of 43%. Emissions from surface transport accounted for 22% of carbon dioxide emissions in the UK in 2019 with cars being responsible for over half of that. The Climate Change Committee has suggested that transport will need to cut its emissions to zero by a mix of demand reduction, the adoption of more efficient combustion engine vehicles, changing to non-car based modes and electrification of the fleet.

Air transport

There are 471 airports and airfields in the UK, of which 334 are paved.  There are also 11 heliports. (2004 CIA estimates)

Heathrow Airport is the largest airport by traffic volume in the country, is owned by Heathrow Airport Holdings, and also the one of the top 10 world's busiest airports by passenger numbers. Gatwick Airport is the second largest airport, is owned by Global Infrastructure Partners, and the third largest is Manchester Airport, which is run by Manchester Airport Group, which also owns various other airports.

Outside England, Cardiff, Edinburgh and Belfast, are the busiest airports serving Wales, Scotland and Northern Ireland respectively.

The largest airline in the United Kingdom by passenger traffic is easyJet, whereas British Airways is largest by fleet size and international destinations. Others include Jet2, TUI Airways and Virgin Atlantic.

Rail transport

The rail network in the United Kingdom consists of two independent parts, that of Northern Ireland and that of Great Britain. Since 1994, the latter has been connected to mainland Europe via the Channel Tunnel. The network of Northern Ireland is connected to that of the Republic of Ireland. Urban rail networks are also well developed in London and several other cities. The UK was ranked eighth among national European rail systems in the 2017 European Railway Performance Index assessing intensity of use, quality of service and safety.

Great Britain

The rail network in Great Britain is the oldest such network in the world. The system consists of five high-speed main lines (the West Coast, East Coast, Midland, Great Western and Great Eastern), which radiate from London to the rest of the country, augmented by regional rail lines and dense commuter networks within the major cities. High Speed 1 is operationally separate from the rest of the network, and is built to the same standard as the TGV system in France.

The world's first passenger railway running on steam was the Stockton and Darlington Railway, opened on 27 September 1825. Just under five years later the world's first intercity railway was the Liverpool and Manchester Railway, designed by George Stephenson and opened by the Prime Minister, the Duke of Wellington on 15 September 1830. The network grew rapidly as a patchwork of literally hundreds of separate companies during the Victorian era, which eventually was consolidated into just four by 1922, as the boom in railways ended and they began to lose money. Eventually, the entire system came under state control in 1948, under the British Transport Commission's Railway Executive. After 1962 it came under the control of the British Railways Board; then British Railways (later British Rail), and the network was reduced to less than half of its original size by the infamous Beeching cuts of the 1960s when many unprofitable branch lines were closed. Several stations have been reopened in Wales.

In 1994 and 1995, British Rail was split into infrastructure, maintenance, rolling stock, passenger and freight companies, which were privatised from 1996 to 1997. The privatisation has delivered very mixed results, with healthy passenger growth, mass refurbishment of infrastructure, investment in new rolling stock, and safety improvements being offset by concerns over network capacity and the overall cost to the taxpayer, which has increased due to growth in passenger numbers. It has also led to some confusion as to who looks after different aspects of the rail service among the general public. This is because, for example, different companies run the tracks to those that run the trains and locomotives. Since privatisation, passenger levels have more than doubled and have surpassed the level they had been at in the late 1940s. But while the price of anytime and off-peak tickets has increased, the price of Advance tickets has dramatically decreased in real terms: the average Advance ticket in 1995 cost £9.14 (in 2014 prices) compared to £5.17 in 2014. Subsidies to the rail industry have slightly increased from £3.7bn in 1992–93 to £3.9bn in 2012–13 (in 2013 prices) but more than halved in terms of subsidy per journey from £4.98 to £2.46.

In Britain, the infrastructure (track, stations, depots and signalling chiefly) is owned and maintained by Network Rail, a not-for-profit company. Network Rail replaced Railtrack, which became bankrupt in 2002 following the Hatfield rail crash in 2000. Passenger services are operated by train-operating companies (TOCs), which are franchises awarded by the Department for Transport (in England), Transport Scotland, and Transport for Wales. Examples include Avanti West Coast and East Midlands Railway. Freight trains are operated by freight operating companies, such as DB Cargo UK, which are commercial operations unsupported by the government. Most train operating companies do not own the locomotives and coaches that they use to operate passenger services. Instead, they are required to lease these from the three rolling stock companies (ROSCOs), with train maintenance carried out by companies such as Bombardier and Alstom.

On High Speed 1, trains are now able to reach the speeds of French TGVs. High Speed 2  is critical for the UK's low carbon transport future. HS2 is a new high speed railway linking up London, the Midlands, the North and Scotland serving over 25 stations, including eight of Britain's 10 largest cities and connecting around 30 million. Network Rail are considering reopening a railway in south-west England connecting Tavistock to Okehampton and Exeter as an alternative to the coastal mainline which was damaged at Dawlish by coastal storms in February 2014, causing widespread disruption.

To cope with increasing passenger numbers, there is a large ongoing programme of upgrades to the network, including Thameslink, Crossrail, electrification of lines, in-cab signalling, new inter-city trains and a new high-speed line. Great British Railways is a planned state-owned public body that will oversee rail transport in Great Britain from 2023. The Office of Rail and Road is responsible for the economic and safety regulation of the UK's railways.

Northern Ireland

In Northern Ireland, Northern Ireland Railways (NIR) both owns the infrastructure and operates passenger rail services. The Northern Ireland rail network is one of the few networks in Europe that carry no freight. It is publicly owned. NIR was united in 1996 with Northern Ireland's two publicly owned bus operators – Ulsterbus and Metro (formally Citybus) – under the brand Translink.

International rail services

Eurostar operates trains via the Channel Tunnel to France, Belgium and The Netherlands, while the joint Northern Ireland Railways/Iarnród Éireann Enterprise trains link Northern Ireland and the Republic of Ireland as well as one Iarnród Éireann train per weekday in the morning from Dublin to Newry.

Rapid transit

Three cities in the United Kingdom have rapid transit systems. The most well known is the London Underground (commonly known as the Tube), the oldest rapid transit system in the world (opened 1863). Another system also in London is the separate Docklands Light Railway (opened 1987). Although this is more of an elevated light metro system due to its lower passenger capacities; further, it is integrated with the Underground in many ways). Outside London, there is the Glasgow Subway which is the third oldest rapid transit system in the world (opened 1896). One other system, the Tyne & Wear Metro (opened 1980), serves Newcastle, Gateshead, Sunderland, North Tyneside and South Tyneside, and has many similarities to a rapid transit system including underground stations, but is sometimes considered to be light rail.

Urban rail

Urban commuter rail networks are focused on many of the country's major cities:
Belfast – Belfast Suburban Rail
Birmingham – West Midlands Railway
Bristol – Great Western Railway and proposed MetroWest
Cardiff – Valley Lines including proposed South Wales Metro
Edinburgh – ScotRail
Glasgow – ScotRail
Leeds – MetroTrain
Liverpool – Merseyrail
London – London Underground, London Overground, and Elizabeth line
Manchester – Northern and TransPennine Express
Newcastle – Tyne & Wear Metro

They consist of several railway lines connecting city centre stations of major cities to suburbs and surrounding towns. Train services and ticketing are fully integrated with the national rail network and are not considered separate.

In London, a route for Crossrail 2 has been safeguarded.

Trams and light rail
Tram systems were popular in the United Kingdom in the late 19th and early 20th century. However, with the rise of the car they began to be widely dismantled in the 1950s. By 1962 only the Blackpool tramway and the Glasgow Corporation Tramways remained; the final Glasgow service was withdrawn on 4 September 1962. Recent years have seen a revival the United Kingdom, as in other countries, of trams together with light rail systems.

Road transport

Road is the most popular method of transport in the United Kingdom, carrying over 90% of motorised passenger travel and 65% of domestic freight. The major motorways and trunk roads, many of which are dual carriageway, form the trunk network which links all cities and major towns. These carry about one third of the nation's traffic, and occupy about 0.16% of its land area.

The motorway system, which was constructed from the 1950s onwards, is stated by the British Chambers of Commerce to be, by virtually every measurement of motorway capacity, well below the capacity of other leading European nations, They give comparative figures for a selection of nations of (units = km/million population): United Kingdom 60, Luxembourg 280, Spain 225, Austria 200, France 185, Belgium 165, Denmark 165, Sweden 165, Netherlands 140, Germany 140, Italy 115, Finland 100, Portugal 80, Greece 45 and Ireland 30. although many other roads are of near motorway standard.

National Highways (a UK government-owned company) is responsible for maintaining motorways and trunk roads in England. Other English roads are maintained by local authorities. In Scotland and Wales roads are the responsibility of Transport Scotland, an executive agency of the Scottish Government, and the North and Mid Wales Trunk Road Agent and South Wales Trunk Road Agent on behalf of the Welsh Government respectively. Northern Ireland's roads are overseen by the Department for Infrastructure Roads (DfI Roads). In London, Transport for London is responsible for all trunk roads and other major roads, which are part of the Transport for London Road Network.

Toll roads are rare in the United Kingdom, though there are a number of toll bridges. Road traffic congestion has been identified as a key concern for the future prosperity of the United Kingdom, and policies and measures are being investigated and developed by the government to reduce congestion. In 2003, the United Kingdom's first toll motorway, the M6 Toll, opened in the West Midlands area to relieve the congested M6 motorway. Rod Eddington, in his 2006 report Transport's role in sustaining the UK's productivity and competitiveness, recommended that the congestion problem should be tackled with a "sophisticated policy mix" of congestion-targeted road pricing and improving the capacity and performance of the transport network through infrastructure investment and better use of the existing network. Congestion charging systems do operate in the cities of London and Durham and on the Dartford Crossing. In 2005, the Government published proposals for a United Kingdom-wide road pricing scheme. This was designed to be revenue neutral with other motoring taxes to be reduced to compensate. The plans were extremely controversial; 1.8 million people signed a petition against them.

Driving is on the left. The usual maximum speed limit is 70 miles per hour (112 km/h) on motorways and dual carriageways. On 29 April 2015, the UK Supreme Court ruled that the government must take immediate action to cut air pollution, following a case brought by environmental lawyers at ClientEarth.

Cycle infrastructure

The National Cycle Network, created by the charity Sustrans, is the UK's major network of signed routes for cycling. It uses dedicated bike paths as well as roads with minimal traffic, and covers 14,000 miles, passing within a mile of half of all homes. Other cycling routes such as The National Byway, the Sea to Sea Cycle Route and local cycleways can be found across the country.

Segregated cycle paths are being installed in some cities in the UK such as London, Glasgow, Manchester, Bristol, Cardiff for example. In London Transport for London has installed Cycleways.

Road passenger transport

Buses

Local bus services cover the whole country. Since deregulation the majority (80% by the late 1990s) of these local bus companies have been taken over by one of the "Big Five" private transport companies: Arriva, FirstGroup, Go-Ahead Group, National Express and Stagecoach Group. In Northern Ireland coach, bus (and rail) services remain state-owned and are provided by Translink.

Coaches

Coaches provide long-distance links throughout the UK: in England and Wales the majority of coach services are provided by National Express. Flixbus and Megabus run no-frills coach services in competition with National Express, the latter's services in Scotland are operated in co-operation with Scottish Citylink. BlaBlaBus also operate to France and the Low Countries from London.

Road freight transport
In 2014, there were around 285,000 HGV drivers in the UK and in 2013 the trucking industry moved 1.6 billion tonnes of goods, generating £22.9 billion in revenue.

Water transport
Due to the United Kingdom's island location, before the Channel Tunnel the only way to enter or leave the country (apart from air travel) was on water, except at the border between Northern Ireland and the Republic of Ireland.

Ports and harbours

About 95% of freight enters the United Kingdom by sea (75% by value). Three major ports handle the most freight traffic:
Grimsby & Immingham on the east coast.
Port of London, on the River Thames.
Milford Haven, in south-west Wales.

There are many other ports and harbours around the United Kingdom, including the following:

Aberdeen, Avonmouth, Barrow, Barry, Belfast, Boston, Bristol, Cairnryan, Cardiff, Dover, Edinburgh/Leith, Falmouth, Felixstowe, Fishguard, Glasgow, Gloucester, Grangemouth, Grimsby, Harwich, Heysham, Holyhead, Hull, Kirkwall, Larne, Liverpool, Londonderry, Manchester, Oban, Pembroke Dock, Peterhead, Plymouth, Poole, Port Talbot, Portishead, Portsmouth, Scapa Flow, Southampton, Stornoway, Stranraer, Sullom Voe, Swansea, Tees (Middlesbrough), Tyne (Newcastle).

Merchant marine

For long periods of recent history, Britain had the largest registered merchant fleet in the world, but it has slipped down the rankings partly due to the use of flags of convenience. These are split into the following types: bulk carrier 18, cargo ship 55, chemical tanker 48, container ship 134, liquefied gas 11, passenger ship 12, passenger/cargo ship 64, petroleum tanker 40, refrigerated cargo ship 19, roll-on/roll-off 25, vehicle carrier 3. There are also 446 ships registered in other countries, and 202 foreign-owned ships registered in the United Kingdom. (2005 CIA)

Ferries
Ferries, both passenger only and passengers and vehicles, operate within the United Kingdom across rivers and stretches of water. In east London the Woolwich Ferry links the North and South Circular Roads. Gosport and Portsmouth are linked by the Gosport Ferry; Southampton and Isle of Wight are linked by ferry and fast Catamaran ferries; North Shields and South Shields on Tyneside are linked by the Shields Ferry; and the Mersey has the Mersey Ferry.

In Scotland, Caledonian MacBrayne provides passenger and RO-RO ferry services in the Firth of Clyde, to various islands of the Inner and Outer Hebrides from Oban and other ports. Orkney Ferries provides services within the Orkney Isles; and NorthLink Ferries provides services from the Scottish mainland to Orkney and Shetland, mainly from Aberdeen although other ports are also used. Ferries operate to Northern Ireland from Stranraer and Cairnryan to Larne and Belfast.

Holyhead, Pembroke Dock and Fishguard are the principal ports for ferries between Wales and Ireland. Heysham and Liverpool/Birkenhead have ferry services to the Isle of Man.

Passenger ferries operate internationally to nearby countries such as France, the Republic of Ireland, Belgium, the Netherlands, and Spain. Ferries usually originate from one of the following:
Dover with services to Calais operated by P&O Ferries, My Ferry Link and DFDS Seaways.
Portsmouth International Port is the main hub for longer services on the Western Channel to Ouistreham, Le Havre, Cherbourg and Saint Malo in France, and Santander and Bilbao in Spain. Most services are operated by French company Brittany Ferries with some to Cherbourg and Le Havre by Condor Ferries and DFDS Seaways.
Services from Plymouth operate to Santander (Spain) and Roscoff (France) with Brittany Ferries.
Services from Weymouth and Poole operate to the Channel Islands with Condor Ferries and to Cherbourg (from Poole) with Brittany Ferries.
Holyhead is the principal ferry port for services to Ireland, operated by Irish Ferries and Stena Line with some services originating from Pembroke.
Hull and Harwich are the main hubs for services to the Netherlands.

More services from Ramsgate, Newhaven, Southampton, and Lymington operate to France, Belgium and the Isle of Wight.

Waterbuses operate on rivers in some of the country's largest cities such as London (London River Services and Thames Clippers), Cardiff (Cardiff Waterbus) and Bristol (Bristol Ferry Boat).

Other shipping
Cruise ships depart from the United Kingdom for destinations worldwide, many heading for ports around the Mediterranean and Caribbean.
The Solent is a world centre for yachting and home to largest number of private yachts in the world.

Inland waterways

Major canal building began in the United Kingdom after the onset of the Industrial revolution in the 18th century. A large canal network was built and it became the primary method of transporting goods throughout the country; however, by the 1830s with the development of the railways, the canal network began to go into decline.

There are currently  of waterways in the United Kingdom and the primary use is recreational.  is used for commerce. (2004 CIA estimate)

Education and professional development
The United Kingdom also has a well-developed network of organisations offering education and professional development in the transport and logistics sectors. A number of Universities offer degree programmes in transport, usually covering transport planning, engineering of transport infrastructure, and management of transport and logistics services. The Institute for Transport Studies  at the  University of Leeds is one such organisation.

Pupils in the United Kingdom can study transport and logistics in apprenticeship studies at further education and sixth form colleges. Professional development for those working in the transport and logistics sectors is provided by a number of Professional Institutes representing specific sectors. These include:

 Chartered Institute of Logistics and Transport (CILT(UK))
 Chartered Institution of Highways and Transportation (CIHT)
 Chartered Institution of Railway Operators
 Transport Planning Society (TPS)

Through these professional bodies, transport planners and engineers can train for a number of professional qualifications, including:
 Chartered engineer
 Incorporated engineer
 Transport planning professional

See also
Campaign for Better Transport (United Kingdom)
Climate Change Act 2008
List of modern tramway and light rail systems in the United Kingdom
List of town tramway systems in the United Kingdom
List of trolleybus systems in the United Kingdom
Royal Train
Transport Direct
Transport in England
Transport in the Republic of Ireland
United Kingdom

References